Bruce Baldwin is a former American football defensive back who played four seasons for the Harding Bisons and part of one season for the Denver Broncos.  Baldwin was selected in the fourth round of the 1983 NFL Draft.

References

Living people
1959 births
People from Jacksonville, Illinois
Harding Bisons football players